

The Church of the Good Shepherd is a historic Episcopal church located at 1448 Highway 107 South in Cashiers, Jackson County, North Carolina. It was built about 1895, and is a Gothic Revival style rectangular frame church.  It is sheathed in weatherboard and has a steeply pitched roof.  It features three lancet windows and a bell tower with a pyramidal roof.

On February 20, 1986, it was added to the National Register of Historic Places.

Current use
The Church of the Good Shepherd is still a functioning parish. The current rector is the Rev. Rob Wood.

References

External links
Church of the Good Shepherd website

Gothic Revival church buildings in North Carolina
Episcopal church buildings in North Carolina
Churches on the National Register of Historic Places in North Carolina
Churches in Jackson County, North Carolina
National Register of Historic Places in Jackson County, North Carolina